The 2024 World Athletics Relays will be held in Nassau, Bahamas, during 2 days in April or May 2024.

The first 3 editions of the IAAF World Relays (former name) have been held in the same site: 2014 IAAF World Relays, 2015 IAAF World Relays and 2017 IAAF World Relays. Nassau won the bid against Lausanne in November 2022, in Rome.

These World Relays will serve as a qualifying event for the 2024 Summer Olympic Games from their respective NOCs, composed of the following:
 14: top fourteen teams of each event based on their results achieved at the 2024 World Athletics Relays in Nassau, Bahamas.

The World Athletics Relays will involve 32 national teams, in each relay event, and 20 races on both days of competition.

On day 1, which will qualify 40 teams for the Summer Olympics, there will be 20 heats across the five olympic events (4 heats each for 4x100, 4x400, men, women and mixed): the top two teams from each heat will directly qualify for the Games.

On day 2, an additional 30 national teams will also be qualified for the Games, through 15 repechage heats (the first 2 at each repechage will so qualify) and five finals, across those five events.

References

External links
 
 World Athletics website
 Official program
 Facts and figures

 
World Athletics Relays
World Relays
International athletics competitions hosted by the Bahamas
World Relays